Edward Kawak (also known as Eduardo Kawak) (February 28, 1959 in Zahlé Lebanon – May 21, 2006 in China) was a professional bodybuilder.

Kawak moved to France and began his career in bodybuilding. After winning 5 NABBA Universe titles, Kawak moved over to the IFBB. He died from a heart attack in China.

Bodybuilding history 
BORN:In Zahle Lebanon

1980
World Championships - WABBA, Overall Winner 
World Championships - WABBA, Medium, 1st

1981
World Championships - WABBA, Professional, 1st

1982
European Championships - WABBA, Professional, 1st
Universe - Pro - NABBA, Winner 
World Championships - WABBA, Professional, 2nd

1983
Universe - Pro - NABBA, Winner 
World Championships - WABBA, Professional, 2nd

1984
European Championships - NABBA, Professional, 1st
Universe - Pro - NABBA, Winner 
World Championships - WABBA, Professional, 1st

1985
European Championships - NABBA, Professional, 1st
Universe - Pro - NABBA, Winner 
World Championships - WABBA, Professional, 3rd

1986
Los Angeles Pro Championships - IFBB, 8th
Night of Champions - IFBB, 8th
Olympia - IFBB, 13th
World Pro Championships - IFBB, 8th

1987
Grand Prix France - IFBB, 8th
Grand Prix Germany - IFBB, 8th
Night of Champions - IFBB, Did not place
Olympia - IFBB, 8th
World Pro Championships - IFBB, 4th

1988
Grand Prix England - IFBB, 17th
Grand Prix Germany - IFBB, 11th
Grand Prix Greece - IFBB, 10th
Grand Prix Spain - IFBB, 14th
Olympia - IFBB, 16th
World Pro Championships - IFBB, 12th

1989
Universe - Pro - NABBA, 2nd
World Championships - WABBA, Professional, 2nd

1990
World Championships - WABBA, Professional, 1st

1991
World Championships - NABBA, Professional, 3rd

1992
Universe - Pro - NABBA, 2nd

1993
Universe - Pro - NABBA, Winner

1995
World Championships - WABBA, Professional, 2nd

1996
Night of Champions - IFBB, 13th

1999
Olympia - Masters - IFBB, 13th

Death
Edward Kawak died on Saturday May 21, 2006, in Beijing China, of a heart attack. He was 47 years old.

References

French bodybuilders
1959 births
2006 deaths